William Willett (1856–1915) was an English builder and promoter of daylight saving time.

William Willett may also refer to:
William Willett Jr. (1869–1938), U.S. Representative
William Willett (Royal Navy officer) (1919–1976)

See also
William Willet, American artist
William Willetts (disambiguation)